Edward Emerson may refer to:
 Denny Emerson (Edward E. Emerson; born 1941), American equestrian
 Eddie Emerson (1892–1970), Canadian football player
 Edward Emerson (priest) (1838–1926), Archdeacon of Cork
 Edward Waldo Emerson (1844–1930), American physician, writer and lecturer